Psalmus Hungaricus, Op. 13, is a choral work for tenor, chorus and orchestra by Zoltán Kodály, composed in 1923. The Psalmus was commissioned to celebrate the fiftieth anniversary of the unification of Buda, Pest and Óbuda for a gala performance on 19 November 1923 along with the Dance Suite by Béla Bartók, and the Festival Overture by Ernő Dohnányi, who conducted the concert. The work's first performance outside Hungary took place under Volkmar Andreae in Zürich on 18 June 1926. This marked a turning point in the international recognition of Kodály as a composer, beyond his renown as an ethnomusicologist and music educator.

Background 

The text is based on the gloss of Psalm 55, "Give ear to my prayer, oh God", by 16th-century poet, preacher, and translator . Uncommonly, Kodály chose a sacred text to mark a secular occasion; the libretto's passages of despair and call to God provide opportunities for the composer to address Hungary's tragic past and disastrous post-Trianon Treaty predicament, when it lost over 70% of its national territory. The music reflects the nation's crisis during and after World War I (the partition of the historical Hungary), and the text draws a parallel between the sorrows of King David and the suffering of the Magyars in Ottoman Hungary. Thus, the Psalmus Hungaricus encompasses two and a half millennia of political distress.

Description 

At the beginning of the first movement, a terse orchestral prelude yields quickly to a brief subdued choral entry. The solo tenor follows closely with the rhapsodic aria, "Oh, that I had wings like a dove". After the first tenor solo section, the chorus responds with a brief, gentle passage, but the tenor reacts vehemently, indicting those sinners who plot the downfall of innocents. This provokes a wordless female choral lamentation, and their cries joined by the tenor's part propel the work to the climactic choral assertion that "God shall hear, and afflict them". A dramatic monologue sung by the tenor ensues, continuing nearly to the movement's finale, when the chorus erupts.

The second movement follows attacca without pause, in a contrasting pensive mood, featuring extended solos for clarinet and violin, over a shimmering undercurrent of harp and pizzicato strings. The tenor returns with a lyrical, yearning aria, "But reassure my heart", which combines fervor and tenderness.

The final movement primarily features the entire chorus, alternating sounds of martial bombast with words of defiance. The work ends with a hushed prayer.

Although Kodály never literally quotes Hungarian folk songs in Psalmus, he integrates folklike pentatonic motifs with plagal cadences that combine to make this music an intense national experience for generations of Hungarians. One of Kodály's genuine masterworks, Psalmus Hungaricus has rarely been performed or recorded outside of Hungary.

Discography 
 Gabor Carelli, North Texas State College Chorus and Dallas Symphony Orchestra, Antal Doráti, cond., recorded 5 January 1949, RCA Victor DM 1331, issued May 1950; issued on CD by the Doráti Society, coupled with a Kodály rarity, Jesus and the Traders  
 Ernst Haefliger, Radio Symphony Orchestra of Berlin, Ferenc Fricsay, cond., 1959 (Deutsche Grammophon) (in German).
 József Simándy, Musikaliska Sällskapet Chorus and Stockholm Philharmonic Orchestra, Antal Doráti, cond., live recording 16 December 1967, BIS CD 421–424, issued January 1988
 József Simándy, Hungarian State Radio Chorus and Hungarian State Orchestra, Antal Doráti, cond., recorded 24–27 September 1968 (Hungaroton). 
 Lajos Kozma, Brighton Festival Chorus, London Symphony Orchestra, István Kertész, cond., 1970 (Decca).
 Janos B. Nagy, Hungarian Radio Chorus and Budapest Philharmonic Orchestra, Arpad Joó, cond., 1982 (Arts Music).
 Daroczy, Budapest Festival Orchestra, Sir Georg Solti, cond., 1998 (London).
 Nilsson, Raymond, London Philharmonic Orchestra & Chorus [Janos Ferencsik, Conductor], 1989 (Priceless CD D25335)(also Everest Records SDBR-3022)*
 Sir Charles Mackerras. Danish Radio Symphony Orchestra and Chorus.

References

Further reading 

 "Psalmus Hungaricus", The Concise Oxford Dictionary of Music, Michael Kennedy and Joyce Bourne, 1996
 Jonathan D. Green, A Conductor's Guide to Choral-Orchestral Works, Twentieth Century, part II, Rowman & Littlefield, 1998, p. 86.

Compositions by Zoltán Kodály
Compositions set in Hungary
1923 compositions
Choral compositions
Psalm settings